Above the Clouds may refer to:
"Above The Clouds", a song by Amber from her 1999 album Amber
 "Above the Clouds", a song by Electric Light Orchestra from their 1976 album A New World Record
 "Above the Clouds", a song by Paul Weller from his 1992 album Paul Weller
 "Above the Clouds", a song by Gang Starr from their 1998 album Moment of Truth
 "Above the Clouds", a song by Delerium featuring Shelley Harland released digitally in 2003
 "Above the Clouds", a song by Cyndi Lauper from her 2005 album The Body Acoustic
 Above the Clouds, a 1933 action drama film directed by Roy William Neill